Elachista inscia is a moth of the family Elachistidae. It is found in South Africa.

References

Endemic moths of South Africa
inscia
Moths described in 1911
Moths of Africa